Agios Vasileios is a coastal village  in the municipal unit of Rio, in the municipality of Patras. It is located on the Gulf of Corinth, 3 km northeast of Rio, Greece.  The Greek National Road 8A (Patras - Corinth) passes south of the village.

Historical population

See also
List of settlements in Achaea

Gallery

References

Populated places in Achaea
Rio, Greece